Euro Shopper was a discount brand of everyday commodities developed and marketed by AMS Sourcing B.V. It was introduced to the market in 1996, and branded products have been sold by some of the AMS members in different countries in Europe since then. In all stores owned by the Dutch Ahold group, all Euro-Shopper products have been phased out to become AH Basic.

Most Euro Shopper products were commodities with long shelf life. There were both national products, sold in only one country, and international products, sold in all countries. On 10 December 2012, sales of Euro Shopper products hit £150m.

From April 2013 to 2014, Both ICA Sweden and Ahold were phasing out Euro Shopper branded products replacing them with their own brands, ICA Basic in Sweden and AH Basic in all countries where they have stores.

AMS members selling Euro Shopper branded products as of 2008

See also
 AH Basic
 Value brands in the United Kingdom

References

External links
AMS information page on Euro Shopper

Store brands